Independiente may refer to:
the Spanish word for independent

Music
Independiente (record label), a record label formed in 1997
Independiente (Dragon Ash album), 2007
Independiente (Ricardo Arjona album), 2011
Independiente, an album by Tito Rojas, 2011

Sports clubs 
Atlético Independiente, a Honduran football club
Club Atlético Independiente, an Argentine football club
Club Sportivo Independiente, an Argentine basketball club
Independiente de Bigand, an Argentine football club
Independiente F.C., a Panamanian football club
Independiente F.B.C., a Paraguayan football club
Independiente Medellín, a Colombian football club
Independiente Nacional 1906, a Salvadoran football club
Independiente de Neuquén, an Argentine football club
Independiente Rivadavia, an Argentine football club
Independiente Rugby Club, a Spanish rugby union club
Independiente Santa Fe, a Colombian football club
Independiente del Valle, an Ecuadorian football club

Religion
 a member of the Philippine Independent Church

See also
Independent (disambiguation)